Bima may stand for:

Indonesia
 Bima Train is an executive class train that is operated by PT Kereta Api Indonesia (Persero) in Java with the service running between Gambir Station (GMR) - Surabaya Gubeng Station (SGU) - Malang Station (ML)
 Bima (train), an express train in Indonesia from Jakarta to Surabaya via Yogyakarta
 BIMA Satria Garuda, an Indonesian tokusatsu series
 Satria Garuda BIMA-X, an Indonesian tokusatsu series
 Bhima, the second born of the Pandavas in Hindu mythology, known as Bima in Indonesia
Esemka Bima, several light commercial pickup vehicles

Sumbawa
A former state in Indonesia and its people, language, location:
 Bima, a city on Sumbawa, Indonesia
 Sultanate of Bima, a former sultanate in Indonesia
 Bima Regency, a regency surrounding the city of Bima
 Bima Airport, an airport near Bima city
 Bima Bay, a bay next to Sumbawa and the city and regency of Bima
 Bimanese people, an ethnic group native to the island of Sumbawa
 Bima language, an Austronesian language spoken on Sumbawa Island
 Bima-Sumba languages, a group of Austronesian languages native to Sumbawa Island

Other places
 Bima, Nepal, a village in Nepal

Other uses
 Bima (dredge), a bucket-line dredge used for mining 1979–1990
 Berkeley-Illinois-Maryland Association, a telescope consortium
 Bundesanstalt für Immobilienaufgaben (BImA), a German government agency
 British Interactive Media Association
 Bema (also spelled Bimah), a raised platform or stage in a Jewish synagogue or an Eastern Christian church
 Centro de Eventos Bima, a concert center located next to the Bima Outlet Mall in Bogotá, Colombia